Menno van Meeteren Brouwer (11 October 1882 – 11 July 1974) was a Dutch painter. His work was part of the painting event in the art competition at the 1932 Summer Olympics.

References

1882 births
1974 deaths
20th-century Dutch painters
Dutch male painters
Olympic competitors in art competitions
People from Zwolle
20th-century Dutch male artists